You Will Know Me is a murder mystery written by Megan Abbott, published July 26, 2016 by Little, Brown and Company.  The book follows the Knox family after a family friend is killed in a hit-and-run car crash before the daughter's gymnastics competition.

Plot 
At the beginning of the You Will Know Me, a young man who is a family friend is killed in a hit-and-run car crash shortly before a gymnastics competition. The follows Devon Knox, a hopeful Olympian gymnast, and her parents, Katie and Eric Knox, who have imposed excessive burdens on themselves, emotionally and financially, to support their 15-year-old daughter. The story is told according to Katie's point of view and showcases the family unraveling as Eric is suspected to be tied to the young man's death.

Reception 
You Will Know Me was well-received by critics, including starred reviews from Booklist, Kirkus Reviews, and Library Journal. Booklist called the novel a "dazzling tale" that "explor[es] the agony and urgency of their desire, the unknowability of others, and the burden of expectations laid on the gymnasts. It’s vivid, troubling, and powerful—and Abbott totally sticks the landing." Library Journal highlighted Abbott's strength of creating unpredictable plotlines, noting that "the plot consistently confounds expectations with its clever twists and turns." Kirkus wrote, "Abbott proves herself a master of fingernails-digging-into-your-palms suspense."

Pittsburgh Post-Gazette echoed Kirkus's review, writing, "Rather than curve balls in the plot, it’s the chilling emotional twists that make the story so intriguing." The New York Times continued Abbot's praise for plot and suspense, saying she"is in top form in this novel. She resumes her customary role of black cat, opaque and unblinking, filling her readers with queasy suspicion at every turn."

Multiple reviews also highlighted a common theme in Abbott's novels: psychosocial relations. NPR's Maureen Corrigan called the book "a masterful thriller that also offers an eerily precise portrait of the way teenage and parental cliques operate." Shelf Awareness continued, "Abbott is working at the top of her craft, and You Will Know Me is a crime novel where the crime is only a catalyst for an accomplished exploration of ordinary people's unraveling when they become obsessed with the extraordinary among them."

Publishers Weekly focused their review primarily on the book's characters: "Eric usually sounds uptight and anxious, and when he and Katie are alone, a little furtive. Devon is brimming with entitlement, impatience, and intolerance. Her fellow gymnasts are humorless, snarky, soft-spoken or arrogant. All are almost as driven as their parents, for whom Olympic excellence is all that matters in their lives."

In reviews, Abbott's writing skill in You Will Know Me was likened to literary giants Richard Yates, John Cheever, and Stephen King.

References 

2016 American novels
American mystery novels
American sports novels
Little, Brown and Company books